Paul Fonoroff (born 1954 in Cleveland, Ohio) is one of Hong Kong's best known film critics and film historians.

Biography 
A native of Cleveland, Ohio, Paul Kendel Fonoroff began studying Chinese in high school, continuing at Brown University and at Singapore’s Nanyang University. Turning his focus to film, he subsequently obtained a Master’s in Fine Arts at University of Southern California, and a grant to research Chinese cinema at Peking University. In 1983 he moved to Hong Kong, where he remained for decades, hosting over a thousand television segments related to film (in Cantonese, Mandarin, and English), and appearing in over twenty movies.  He authored over two thousand articles for an array of publications, primarily as movie columnist for Hong Kong's The South China Morning Post from the 1980s to the 2010s.

Some of Fonoroff’s columns from these years have been anthologized in At the Hong Kong Movies: 600 Reviews from 1988 Till the Handover (Hong Kong, 1998). This was preceded by his Silver Light: A Pictorial History of Hong Kong Cinema 1920–1970 (Hong Kong, 1997), a picture book based on Fonoroff's extensive collection of Hong Kong movie memorabilia, which was simultaneously issued in Chinese translation.  The collection was later showcased in Chinese Movie Magazines: From Charlie Chaplin to Chairman Mao 1951-1981, included in The New York Times selection of Best Art Books of 2018.  In 2016, Fonoroff's collection was acquired by the University of California-Berkeley's CV Starr East Asian Library and christened the Paul Kendel Fonoroff Collection for Chinese Film Studies.

Fonoroff is a member of the Hong Kong Film Critics Society and the Performing Artists Guild of Hong Kong, and advisor to the Hong Kong Film Archives.

Movie-Related Series
Watching Cantonese Classics 粵語長片是咁睇的 (2021-2022) - Cantonese 
Asian Movie Archaeologist 方保羅-電影考古家 (2010) - Mandarin 
Hong Kong Movie Odyssey (2004) - English
Phoenix Tonight 相聚鳳凰台 (1998-2002) - Mandarin
Movie World 電影世界 (1996-1998) - Mandarin
Entertainment News 非常娛樂 (1994-1996) - Mandarin
Movie Station 電影情報組 (1994-1995) - Cantonese
Look for a Star 星海追蹤 (1993-1994) - English
Camera Time 開麥拉時間 (1991) - Cantonese
Movie Talk 戲人戲語 (1990-1993) - Cantonese
Movie World 電影世界 (1989-1993) - English
Eye on Hong Kong 放眼香港 (1987-1989) - English

Filmography
Helios 赤道 (2015) Martin Koo
Amphetamine 安非他命 (2010)
Drink-Drank-Drunk千杯不醉 (2005) Bookstore Owner
A Family in Hong Kong 香港一家人 (2000) (TV Series)
What Are You Gonna Do, Sai Fung? 1959某日某 (1999) Pierre Birton
Dream Trips 夢之旅 (1999) Dream Guide
Spirit of the Dragon 老鼠龍之猛龍過港 (1998)
Bishonen美少年之戀 (1998)
Lawyer Lawyer 算死草]] (1997) - Judge
I Have a Date with Spring 我和春天有個約會 (1996) - Father Yung 容神父 (TV Series)
Tristar 大三元 (1996) - Bearded Mormon
What a Wonderful Life 奇異旅程之真心愛生命 (1996) - Reporter Going to Canada
Once in a Lifetime 終身大事 (1995) - Doctor
The Final Option 飛虎雄心 (1994) - Police Official
The Rise and Fall of Qing Dynasty IV 十三皇朝:溥儀]] (1992) - Reginald Johnston (TV Series)
Fight Back to School Part 2 逃學威龍2 (1992) - Secretary of Security
Summer Lovers 夏日情人 (1992) - Laserdisc Shop Clerk
Once Upon a Time in China II 黃飛鴻2男兒當自強 (1992) - British Consul
Love: Now You See It... Now You Don't 我愛扭紋柴 (1992) - Surveyor
The Inspector Wears Skirts 4 92霸王花對霸王花  (1992) - Commander
Once Upon a Time a Hero in China 黃飛鴻笑傳 (1992) - Indiana Jones
Alan and Eric Between Hello and Goodbye 雙城故事 (1991) - Hairy Keung
Sworn Brothers肝膽相照 (1987) - Extra in Courtroom
The Herdsman牧馬人 (1982) - Extra Dancing in RestaurantThe Sea is Calling 大海在呼唤'' (1982) - Mabasuo 馬巴索

References

External links
 
 Paul Fonoroff at scmp.com
 

Living people
American film critics
Brown University alumni
Peking University alumni
Writers from Cleveland
USC School of Cinematic Arts alumni
1954 births
Journalists from Ohio
American born Hong Kong artists